Agrotis segetum, sometimes known as the turnip moth, is a moth of the family Noctuidae. The species was first described by Michael Denis and Ignaz Schiffermüller in 1775. It is a common European species and it is found in Africa and across Eurasia except for the northernmost parts.

It is a cutworm in the genus Agrotis, which possibly is the genus that includes the largest number of species of cutworms.

Common names
It is usually known as the common cutworm in English. It is sometimes called the turnip moth in the United Kingdom.

Description
This is a very variable species with the fore-wings ranging from pale buff through to almost black. The paler forms have three dark-bordered stigmata on each fore-wing. Antennae of male bipectinated (comb like on both sides) with moderate length branches. The main feature distinguishing it from other Agrotis species is the shade of the hind-wings, pure white in the males and pearly grey in the females. The wingspan is 32–42 mm.

Edward Meyrick, an English schoolteacher who is especially notable for his study of the microlepidoptera, had this to say about the species:

Agrotis segetum  is difficult to certainly distinguish from its congeners. See Townsend et al.

Agrotis clavis (Hufnagel, 1766) 
Agrotis exclamationis (Linnaeus, 1758

Distribution
It is possible it has been spread by the international trade in nursery stock.

Ecology

Behaviour
In the British Isles, two broods are produced each year, the adults flying in May and June and again in August and September. It is known to migrate some distances. The species is nocturnal and is attracted to light and nectar-rich flowers. The species overwinters as a caterpillar.

Larval behaviour and damage
Agrotis segetum is one of the most important species of noctuid moths whose larvae are called cutworms. The larvae are generally grey, sometimes tinged with purple. They attack the roots and lower stems of a huge range of plants (see list below) and can be a particularly serious pest of root vegetables and cereals. Attacking the lower stems often results in cutting down seedlings, which is why this species is classed as a cutworm.

Recorded host plants
The following is a partial list of genera and other taxa on which the larvae of the turnip moth have been recorded, whether feeding in situ, incidentally, in a laboratory or home breeding situation, or simply having been recorded (perhaps erroneously) in a field of crops. It is striking that the list includes such a sheer variety of plants including resinous, aromatic, and toxic species such as conifers, Eucalyptus, and Nicotiana:

Acacia
Allium
Apium – celery
Arachis – peanut
Asparagus
Beta – beet
Brassica
Camellia
Casuarina
Cedrus – deodar cedar
Chrysanthemum
Cichorium – chicory
Coffea – coffee
Cucurbita
Eucalyptus
Fragaria – strawberry
Glycine – soybean
Gossypium – cotton plant
Hagenia
Helianthus – sunflower
Hibiscus – bissap
Indigofera
Lactuca
Lycopersicon – tomato
Malus – apple
Medicago – alfalfa
Nicotiana – tobacco
Picea – Sitka spruce
Pinus – pine
Pisum – pea
Pseudotsuga – Douglas-fir
Rheum – rhubarb
Rumex
Saccharum – sugar cane
Secale – rye
Sesamum – sesame
Solanum – potato
Sorghum
Spinacia – spinach
Tectona – teak
Trifolium – clover
Triticum – wheat
Vigna – urad bean
Vitis – grape
Zea – maize

Diseases
As with any other noctuid, assorted diseases, predators, and parasitoids attack Agrotis segetum, mainly in the egg and larval stages.

A fungus called Tarichium megaspermum (from the order Entomophthorales) has been found within the infested larvae of the turnip moth. The fungus had killed the insects and left a finely granular mass consisting of large amounts of thick-walled spores.

Spread and control
The insect is not believed to be present in the United States, where the government has been making efforts to prevent its introduction on imported food crops.

Cultural methods such as fallowing land before sowing, to starve the larvae can be effective, and in suitable conditions, ploughing land during the dry season to kill larvae and pupae, and expose them to predators, has been effective in maize fields in South Africa.

Insecticides of various kinds have been used with success for many decades. Baits based on sweetened bran, finely spread, have met with some success.

A Betabaculovirus virus species, "Agrotis segetum granulovirus DA", was first isolated in the USSR in the late 1960s, but despite some research in the 1970s, as of 2017 it has not been found to be commercially viable as a biocontrol for crops.

References

External links

 
"10351 Agrotis segetum ([Denis & Schiffermüller], 1775) - Saateule". Lepiforum e.V. Retrieved 5 December 2019. 

Agrotis
Agricultural pest insects
Owlet moths of Africa
Moths of Asia
Moths of Europe
Taxa named by Michael Denis
Taxa named by Ignaz Schiffermüller